Hassan Shariatmadari (born 1947) is an Iranian opposition politician and a leading proponent of the Free Elections Movement (Jonbeshe Entekhabate Azad) in Iran. He is the son of Grand Ayatollah Seyyed Kazem Shariatmadari (one of the most powerful Shia clerics of Iran in the 1960s and 70s). During the Pahlavi regime, he supported his father's position that the Shah's authority should be limited to what had been specified in the Constitutional revolution of 1906 and that a democratic parliament should be in charge of running the country instead of the monarchy taking an active role in ruling Iran. Between 1973 and 1980 he served as the Chief Editor of Payame Shadi and Nasle Now monthly magazines for children and youth.

At the time of the Iranian revolution of 1979, Shariatmadari co-founded the Iranian People's Republican Party (IPRP). A firm believer in the separation of religion and politics, his movement resisted the establishment of the Velayat-e faqih (Rule of the Jurist) system in Iran and was violently crushed by the Iranian revolutionary guard and the Basij in 1980 after which he went into exile. At its height, IPRP was able to mobilize more than a million people in the Azarbayjan province of Iran to protest against Khomeini's rule.

In 1983, Shariatmadari joined forces with several nationalist and center leftist groups to form the National Republicans of Iran, a coalition aimed at uniting a broad range of secular forces under a common political umbrella organization. In 2004, he joined other secular political leaders of the opposition in the formation of United Republicans for Iran (URI) (Etehadieh Jomhoori khahan), once the largest coalition of Iranian opposition groups after the revolution. The URI envisioned Iran as a democratic republic with constitutional guarantees of civil, political, social rights and individual liberties, separation of religion and state, sustainable social development, gender equality, rights of minorities, and increased local decision-making authority, and supported a non-violent struggle path towards democracy.

Shariatmadari holds two master's degrees, one in Physics from Aryamehr University of Technology (currently Sharif University of Technology) and one in Law from Tehran University. In parallel to his university studies, he studied theology and philosophy at the Qom Shia Seminary and is intimately familiar with Islamic jurisprudence. In June 2013, he gave a series of Persian-language webinars on the role of free and fair elections in transitioning democracies for Tavaana: E-Learning Institute for Iranian Civil Society.

Hassan Shariatmadari is married, has three children, and lives in Hamburg, Germany.

References

Living people
Sharif University of Technology alumni
Muslim People's Republic Party politicians
1947 births
United Republicans of Iran politicians